Rubén Castillo Anchapuri (March 18, 1931 - February 17, 2009) was a Peruvian theologist and biologist.

Peruvian biologists
Peruvian theologians
1931 births
2009 deaths
Peruvian Seventh-day Adventists
Seventh-day Adventist theologians
20th-century biologists